Live Phish Vol. 18 is an album by Phish.  It was recorded live at the Bomb Factory in Dallas, Texas on May 7, 1994.

The show is sometimes referred to as "Tweezerfest" because of a seamless second set that features elements of the song "Tweezer" in almost every song. Throughout the hour-long "Tweezer" experience, the band moves in and out of improvisational jams and riffs from random cover songs like Aerosmith's "Sweet Emotion" to The Breeders's "Cannonball". One of the show's jams occurs after Jon Fishman croons Prince's "Purple Rain".

Bonus tracks include a segment from a concert at University of Missouri on November 22, 1994.

Track listing

Disc one
Set one:
"Llama" (Anastasio) - 5:01
"Horn" (Anastasio, Marshall) - 4:30
"Divided Sky" (Anastasio) - 14:55
"Mound" (Gordon) - 5:53
"Fast Enough for You" (Anastasio, Marshall) - 6:32
"Scent of a Mule" (Gordon) - 7:01
"Split Open and Melt" (Anastasio) - 13:59
"If I Could" (Anastasio) - 5:50
"Suzy Greenberg" (Anastasio, Pollak) - 6:19

Disc two
Set two:
"Loving Cup" (Jagger, Richards) - 6:32
"Sparkle" (Anastasio, Marshall) - 4:30
"Tweezer" (Anastasio, Fishman, Gordon, McConnell) - 25:59
"Sparks" (Townshend) - 2:41
"Makisupa Policeman" (Anastasio, Marshall) - 2:27
"Tweezer" (Anastasio, Fishman, Gordon, McConnell) - 7:29
"Walk Away" (Walsh) - 4:04
"Tweezer" (Anastasio, Fishman, Gordon, McConnell) - 7:25
"Cannonball" (Deal) - 2:06
"Purple Rain" (Prince) - 6:30
"Dallas Jam" (Anastasio, Fishman, Gordon, McConnell) - 5:20
"Tweezer Reprise" (Anastasio, Fishman, Gordon, McConnell) - 4:30

Disc three
Encore:
"Amazing Grace" (Traditional) - 2:03
"Sample in a Jar" (Anastasio, Marshall) - 5:23
Filler (November 22, 1994, Jesse Auditorium, University of Missouri, Columbia, Missouri):
"Funky Bitch" (Seals) - 6:41
"Columbia Jam" (Anastasio, Fishman, Gordon, McConnell) - 22:07
"Jerusalem, Jerusalem (Yerushalayim Shel Zahav)" (Newell, Shemer) - 2:07

Personnel

Trey Anastasio - guitars, lead vocals, a cappella vocals on "Amazing Grace"
Page McConnell - piano, organ, backing vocals, co-lead vocals on "Loving Cup", lead vocals on "Walk Away", a cappella vocals on "Amazing Grace"
Mike Gordon - bass, backing vocals, lead vocals on "Scent of a Mule" and "Funky Bitch", a cappella vocals on "Amazing Grace"
Jon Fishman - drums, backing vocals, lead vocals on "Purple Rain", a cappella vocals on "Amazing Grace"

Setlist from the 'Helping Phriendly Book'

'The Helping Phriendly Book' (HPB) is a detailed setlist archive maintained by fans at phish.net.

SET 1: Llama, Horn -> The Divided Sky, Mound, Fast Enough for You, Scent of a Mule, Split Open and Melt, If I Could, Suzy Greenberg

SET 2: Loving Cup, Sparkle, Tweezer -> Sparks -> Makisupa Policeman -> Sweet Emotion -> Walk Away -> Cannonball# -> Purple Rain -> Hold Your Head Up (HYHU)** -> Tweezer Reprise

ENCORE: Amazing Grace, Sample in a Jar

#The Breeders cover. **With extended jam.

(see also Charlie Dirksen's enthusiastic review of the second set from The HPB at phish.net.)

18
2003 live albums
Elektra Records live albums